Anthene princeps, the cupreous hairtail, is a butterfly of the family Lycaenidae. It is found in Africa.

The wingspan is about 22–27 mm in males and 24–29 mm in females.

The larvae feed on Albizia gummifera.

Subspecies
 Anthene princeps princeps (Senegal, Burkina Faso, Guinea, Sierra Leone, Liberia, Ivory Coast, Ghana, Benin, Nigeria, Niger, Cameroon, Ethiopia, Kenya, Zambia, northern Zimbabwe, north-western Botswana, Eswatini, South Africa: Limpopo Province, Mpumalanga, Free State Province and KwaZulu-Natal)
 Anthene princeps smithii (Mabille, 1877) (Madagascar)

References

Butterflies described in 1876
Anthene
Butterflies of Africa
Taxa named by Arthur Gardiner Butler